Llandudno Amateurs were a football club from Llandudno who existed during the Edwardian era. The club were first mentioned in 1901 following the demise of Llandudno Swifts.  They competed in the North Wales Coast League, Welsh Cup, and North Wales Coast Cup. This incarnation of the club was last mentioned in 1913.

Colours

Seasons

Cup history

Honours

League
North Wales Coast League Division 1
Winners : 1911
Runners-up : 1907

Cup
North Wales Coast Senior Cup
Winners : 1904
Runners-up : 1907

References

Football clubs in Wales
Defunct football clubs in Wales
Llandudno
Association football clubs disestablished in 1913
Association football clubs established in 1901
North Wales Coast League clubs